Taipei Botanical Garden is an under construction metro station on the Wanda–Zhonghe–Shulin line located in Zhongzheng, Taipei, Taiwan. The station is scheduled to open at the end of 2025.

Station overview 
The station will be a three-level, underground station with an island platform. The theme of the station will be based on the “Recollection of Taipei” while the element of cultural heritage sites and the botanical garden is blended into the space, together with the exhibition area of the cultural heritage site to display the particularity of the station's location in the history and culture of Taipei City.

Station layout

Around the station 
Taipei Botanical Garden
Taipei Mandarin Experimental Elementary School

References 

Wanda–Zhonghe–Shulin line stations
Railway stations scheduled to open in 2025